Raúl Gómez (born 3 April 1945) is a former Argentine cyclist. He competed in the team pursuit event at the 1972 Summer Olympics.

References

External links
 

1945 births
Living people
Argentine male cyclists
Olympic cyclists of Argentina
Cyclists at the 1972 Summer Olympics
Place of birth missing (living people)
20th-century Argentine people